Ewald Persson (3 September 1891 – 18 December 1936) was a Swedish wrestler. He competed in the featherweight event at the 1912 Summer Olympics.

References

1891 births
1936 deaths
Olympic wrestlers of Sweden
Wrestlers at the 1912 Summer Olympics
Swedish male sport wrestlers
Sportspeople from Malmö